E. Gary Crawford (born August 30, 1957, in Denver, Colorado) is an American former Nordic combined skier who competed in the 1980 Winter Olympics and in the 1988 Winter Olympics.

References

1957 births
Living people
American male Nordic combined skiers
Olympic Nordic combined skiers of the United States
Nordic combined skiers at the 1980 Winter Olympics
Nordic combined skiers at the 1988 Winter Olympics